Miriam Audrey Hannah (born May 4, 1982), better known as Audrey Hannah, is a German-Canadian presenter, singer-songwriter and ballet dancer.  She is known for the Christmas song "It's December (And I'll Be Missing You)".

Early life
Miriam Hannah was born in Saarbrücken, Germany, to a Canadian mother and a German father. Her father played trumpet in an orchestra. As a child, she learned music and began singing and dancing lessons. At age 14, she graduated as ballet dancer.

Career
In 1996, Hannah signed with a manager and became presenter of Das Ding, a children's program on SR 1 station. In 1998, she presented the Live Attack also in SR 1. The following year, Hannah signed with Edel Records. On November 26, she released her debut single "It's December (And I'll Be Missing You)", a Christmas song that peaked at number 27 on the German charts. On May 15, 2000, she released another single, "Waiting For... (Serenade Of Love)", which did not chart. Hannah signed to EMI and Capitol Records in 2002, and she announced a forthcoming debut album. On November 11, she released the first single from the album. The single, "Liquid Touch", peaked at number 67. However, the album was never released. In 2003 Hannah departed from EMI and Capitol and announced a hiatus.

In 2004 she joined the dance school Euschen-Gebhardt in Saarbrücken, and became an instructor at the school. In 2011, she returned to her artistic career as a presenter of the Big FM radio program Miri's Promi-Ecke.

Since July 29, 2017, she has moderated the drawing of the German lottery numbers, alternating with Chris Fleischhauer.

Musical influences
Hannah cited Kylie Minogue, Britney Spears, Holly Valance, Rachel Stevens and Madonna as her biggest musical influences.

Radio work

Discography

Singles

Music videos

References

1982 births
Living people
21st-century German women singers